The 2012 UEFA Women's Under-17 Championship was the fifth edition of the UEFA Women's Under-17 Championship. The tournament serves as a qualifier to the 2012 FIFA U-17 Women's World Cup. The first qualifying matches were played on 29 September 2011, the final was played on 29 June 2012.

With 42 participating nations a new U-17 record was set.

Qualification

Final round

The four qualifying group winners played the knockout stage in the Centre sportif de Colovray Nyon, Switzerland from 26 to 29 June 2012. There were two semifinals, a third place match and the final.
The third place match as well as the final were decided by penalties. No extra time was played.

Semi-finals

Third place match

Final

References

External links
UEFA.com
Tournament Regulations

 
2012
Women
2012
UEFA
2011–12 in Swiss football
2011–12 in German women's football
2011–12 in French women's football
2011–12 in Danish women's football
2012 in youth sport
June 2012 sports events in Europe
2012 in youth association football